Modern Times is the first album by the British band Latin Quarter. It reached the top 20 in Germany and Sweden and spent two weeks on the UK Albums Chart, peaking at Number 91. It includes the songs "Radio Africa" which reached Number 19 in the UK Singles Chart. and "America for Beginners" which was covered by Toyah on her album Minx.

Political themes
Latin Quarter's lyricist Mike Jones describes the album as "a veritable manifesto" of their left wing views as members of Big Flame. The title track takes its name from the Charlie Chaplin film as it critiques the effect of McCarthyism on Hollywood; "Radio Africa" describes the effect of Imperialism on that continent; "Toulouse" is about racism in France; "No Rope As Long As Time" is a plaintive account of Apartheid South Africa and "America for Beginners" describes the rise of the right wing in the United States.

Track listing
"Modern Times" 3:45
"No Ordinary Return" 3:35 
"Radio Africa" 3:53
"Toulouse" 4:20
"America for Beginners" 5:16
"Eddie" 3:08
"No Rope As Long As Time" 4:28
"Seaport September" 3:18
"New Millionaires" 3:35
"Truth About John" 4:00
"Cora" 2:58

In 2002 a remastered & expanded edition of Modern Times was released, which was titled "Modern Times Plus". This edition features 5 bonus tracks...

"Modern Times" (12" Version)
"Thin White Duke"
"This Side of Midnight"
"Sandinista"
"Voices Inside"

Most online music download stores only provide the original version of "Modern Times" and not "Modern Times Plus".

Charts

Personnel
Carol Douet - vocals, percussion
Yona Dunsford - vocals, piano
Greg Harewood - bass
Steve Jeffries - keyboards, vocals
Steve Skaith - vocals, guitar
Richard Stevens - drums, percussion
Richard Wright - guitar, vocals
Mike Jones - lyrics
Additional musicians
Steve Gregory - saxophone
Martin Ditcham - percussion
Steve Greetham - bass on '3'

References

Latin Quarter (band) albums
1985 debut albums
Arista Records albums